The Al-Iman Mosque is a mosque in the Mazraa district of Damascus, Syria.

March 21st explosion
On March 21, 2013, a suicide bomber killed at least 42 and injured at least 84 people in the mosque. Amongst the killed was the prominent scholar, Mohamed Said Ramadan Al-Bouti.
The mosque was not destroyed in the attack.

References

Mosques in Damascus